Ian Simpson Reisner (born June 27, 1968) is an American entrepreneur, and hotel and real estate developer. He is the founder of Parkview Developers, and co-founder of Watch World International and The Out NYC hotel & resort.

Early life and education
Reisner was born and raised in a Jewish family in New York City. He graduated from Cornell University in 1990,.

Career

Watch World
In 1994, while still working at Salomon Brothers, Reisner, his partner Mati Weiderpass and Paul Dominguez founded Watch World International, opening the first Watch World store in New York City's SoHo neighborhood that year. By July 1997, they had opened nine New York locations. By 2000, Watch World had become a national chain of 119 stores. On June 8, 2000, Sunglass Hut International announced that it had purchased Watch World for $30 million in cash, stock and debt.

Parkview Developers and The 505
Reisner is the founder, managing partner and president of Parkview Developers, a developer of residential and hotel properties, primarily in New York City, which he founded with Mati Weiderpass in 2000.

In 2007, Reisner and Weiderpass launched a 109-unit luxury condominium constructed on the site originally built for the New York Central Railroad in the 1930s.

Parkview Developers owns 20 units in the 230 Central Park South building in New York City. Starting in the early 1990s, Reisner and Weiderpass bought roughly half of the apartment units in the 19-story building. They combined, renovated and sold many of the units, including a penthouse sold for $11.9 million in 2014. Reisner lives in one of the penthouses in the building. Parkview Developers formerly owned and operated the Carnegie Hotel in Manhattan, near Columbus Circle.

The Out NYC
In 2007, after spending a few nights at the Axel Hotel Barcelona, part of a small chain of upscale hotels aimed at a gay clientele, Reisner decided to open a similar type of hotel in New York. He located a vacant space in Manhattan's Hell's Kitchen neighborhood and secured a 49-year lease. The property was originally home to a Travelodge in the 1960s, and was later used as a Red Cross homeless shelter.

The hotel opened on March 1, 2012. The $30 million entertainment complex consists of a three-story, 70,000 square-foot hotel with 105 rooms, the 11,000 square-foot XL/BPM Nightclub, the Mediterranean-inspired KTCHN Restaurant, an art gallery, outdoor gardens, a spa and a bar. The Out NYC was built after five years of planning. It won a Trendsetter Hotel Award from Fodor's in 2012, and in 2014 Fodor's named its garden one of the world's 10 most beautiful hotel gardens. Past performers at The Out NYC and the XL/BPM Nightclub include Alan Cumming, Cyndi Lauper and Ariana Grande; celebrity guests include Lady Gaga, Perez Hilton, James Franco and Nick Jonas.

Reisner was sued by architect Paul Dominguez in 2013 for his failure to properly compensate Dominguez for work on the Out NYC.

Fire Island Pines
On January 22, 2015, Reisner and Sip-N-Twirl nightclub owner P.J. McAteer purchased a strip of commercial real estate along the harbor on Fire Island Pines, a gay destination on Long Island, New York, for $10.1 million at auction.“Gay Mecca on Fire Island Sells for $10.1 Million at Auction,” New York Times, January 22, 2015.</ref>

Television and film
Reisner appeared on season 3 of Million Dollar Listing New York on Bravo. His penthouse duplex at 230 Central Park South has appeared on 30 Rock and in the film Did You Hear About the Morgans? The Out NYC was featured on the sitcom Happily Divorced.

Controversy
On October 29, 2014, 23-year-old Sean Verdi died of an apparent drug overdose at St. Luke's Hospital in Manhattan after being found unconscious in a Manhattan apartment owned by Reisner.

On April 20, 2015, Reisner and Weiderpass hosted Republican US Senator Ted Cruz at Reisner's apartment. News of the chat led to controversy in the gay community and calls for boycotts of Reisner's businesses, with the charity Broadway Cares/Equity Fights AIDS canceling a scheduled fundraiser at XL Nightclub in protest. On April 26, Reisner put out a statement on his Facebook page, apologizing for showing "poor judgment" in hosting the event, adding that he made "a terrible mistake." Reisner raised further controversy when, as part of his response to the episode, he referred to his gay clientele as "frugal" and "entitled".

Personal life
Reisner's brother, equestrian Ross Reisner, was murdered in September 2013 by Brett C. Knight. Knight was sentenced to 22 years in prison for the crime.

References

External links
 Parkview Developers
 The Out NYC
 Fire Island Pines

Living people
1968 births
Cornell University alumni
Businesspeople from New York City
American real estate businesspeople
20th-century American Jews
Real estate and property developers
Hotel founders
New York (state) Republicans
21st-century American Jews